Matías Ezequiel Sánchez (born 5 March 1983) is an Argentine footballer who plays as a midfielder. He is currently a free agent.

Career
Sánchez started his career with Primera B Nacional outfit Atlético de Rafaela, but departed in 2002 to join 9 de Julio of Torneo Argentino A. He made one appearance before leaving in 2003. Three years later, Sánchez played for San Telmo in Primera B Metropolitana, he made eight professional appearances as San Telmo finished 12th. Further moves to Deportivo Moquehuá and Atlético Concepción then followed.

Career statistics
.

References

External links

1983 births
Living people
People from Rafaela
Argentine footballers
Association football midfielders
Primera Nacional players
Torneo Argentino A players
Primera B Metropolitana players
Torneo Argentino C players
Atlético de Rafaela footballers
9 de Julio de Rafaela players
San Telmo footballers
Sportspeople from Santa Fe Province